Patrik Chlum (born 1 December 1981) is a Czech skier. He competed in the Nordic combined event at the 2006 Winter Olympics.

References

1981 births
Living people
Czech male Nordic combined skiers
Olympic Nordic combined skiers of the Czech Republic
Nordic combined skiers at the 2006 Winter Olympics
Sportspeople from Jablonec nad Nisou